Jember Station (JR) is a large-scale railway station located in Jemberlor, Patrang, Jember Regency. The station located at an altitude of +89 meters is the largest station in the management of PT Kereta Api Indonesia (Persero) Operation Area IX Jember. The station is near from Jember town square.

The station that still uses mechanical signaling system has eight tracks plus one track connected to Jember Locomotive Depot located on the northwest part of the station. Tracks 2 (main) and 3 are used for the arrival and departure of most trains; track 1 is also used as departure and arrival only if track 2 and/or 3 are already occupied by another train; track 3-6 for trainset and locomotives parking, and for the track to and from the locomotive; tracks 7 and 8 only used in emergency. tracks 1, 3, and 4 connect directly to the main track (track 2). Track 5-8 are stub-end track. All Trains whose passing Bangil-Kalisat-Ketapang lane must stop at this station.

Services 
Passenger trains that use this station are :

Mixed class (executive and business) 

 Mutiara Timur, to  and 
 Ranggajati, to and from  via ----

Economy class 

 Logawa, to and from  via ---
 Sri Tanjung, to  via -- and 
 Tawang Alun, to  via Bangil and 
 Probowangi, to  and

Local train 

 Pandanwangi, to and from

References 

1. http://kai.id Indonesian Railway Site

External links 

Railway stations in East Java